A Pobra de Trives is a municipality in Ourense in the Galicia region of north-west Spain. It lies towards the north-east of the province.

Parishes 
 Barrio (San Xoán)
 O Castro (San Nicolao)
 Cotarós (Santiago)
 Cova (Santa María)
 A Encomenda (Santo Antonio)
 Mendoia (Nosa Sra. da Concepción)
 Navea (San Miguel)
 Pareisás (Santo Antonio)
 Pena Folenche (Santa María)
 Pena Petada (Santo Estevo)
 Piñeiro (San Sebastián)
 A Pobra de Trives (Sto. Cristo da Misericordia)
 San Lourenzo de Trives (San Lourenzo)
 San Mamede de Trives (San Mamede)
 Sobrado (San Salvador)
 Somoza (San Miguel)
 Trives (Santa María)
 Vilanova (Santa María)
 Xunqueira (San Pedro)

References  

Municipalities in the Province of Ourense